Luigi Persico (1791 Naples - 14 May 1860 Marseille) was an Italian neoclassical painter and sculptor.

Biography
Born in Naples, Luigi Persico studied at the Accademia di Belle Arti di Napoli, then headed by the French painter Jean-Baptiste Wicar. He moved to the United States of America in 1815, where he was soon joined by his brother Gennaro, an art teacher. 
After living some time in Baltimore, he lived between 1817 and 1824 in Lancaster, where he designed and painted portraits (including posthumous, of General Edward Hand). 
During this period, he also works in Harrisburg, where he participated in sculptural decoration of the Capitol Hills, and, after 1818, in Philadelphia, where he sculpted the bust of Dr. Nathaniel Chapman. 
After 1824, he settled in Washington, where he became famous for his bust of Lafayette (1825), directed at the latter's triumphal visit to the United States.

Participation in the setting of the Capitol (1825-1844)

The Genius of America (1825-1828) 
This first success opened the doors of a prestigious order: the pediment of the eastern portico of the Capitol in Washington. On May 31, 1825, Persico, accompanied by the architect Charles Bulfinch, presented this model of the project to President John Quincy Adams. 
He appreciated the allegories of Justice and America, but demanded the replacement of the allegory of the Force, represented by a Hercules too "pagan" to his taste, to an allegory of Hope. 
After noting the president that all the characters are now female, the Italian sculptor accepts the changes required by Adams and developed the figure of Hope leaning on an anchor. Adams has held that this attribute too much like an anchor on the new Dutch ship design Persico, the artist went to the Commodore Thomas Tingey to get a more authentic. 
In June 1828, he told Adams, came to admire the work being completed, "Now, if a sailor looks at this pediment, he will say that the anchor is represented accurately! ". 
The three figures in high relief in the sandstone, about three meters high, were completed in summer 1828. In December of that year, Persico returned to Italy after Adams spoke to his desire to continue working at the sculptural decoration of the Capitol. 
Through the intervention of Adams and favorably received by its pediment, in the following years, he obtained two new sculpture commissions for the same monument.

War and Peace (1829-1834)
The statues of Peace (in the guise of Ceres) and War (in the guise of Mars ), aimed at niches flanking the entrance to the rotunda, are commissioned in 1829 by Adams, who has made the last act of his Presidency.

These two statues, made in Italy, are delivered in 1834, years during which Persico returns to America to sell works of Italian masters, and especially to reactivate its political networks for a new order official. Having failed in this last attempt, he returned to Europe in March 1835. Convinced that no longer work for the U.S. government, the tears when he bade farewell to his patron and friend, John Quincy Adams. 
This disgrace is short lived. He graduated in effect an order of President Van Buren in 1837, following a proposal by Democratic Senator James Buchanan.

The Discovery of America (1837-1844) 

The Discovery of America, was a figure group nearly five meters high including a statue of Christopher Columbus brandishing a globe and a statue of Indian. 
This monumental marble group was directed by Persico in Florence, 9 from 1840, and May 17, 1844 placed to the left of the stairs of the portico. The Discovery of America received mixed reviews from critics and the press, particularly because of the nudity of the female character (criticized, for example, in the Baltimore Sun).
 
The following year, this group is enthusiastically described in the picturesque Store of Edouard Charton: 

These dithyrambs contrast with the severe criticism less than half a century later by Nestor Ponce de Leon, the iconographer of Columbus: 

Between 1958 and 1962, during the expansion and restoration of the Capitol, The Discovery of America and its counterpart, The Rescue, by Horatio Greenough, were removed permanently after  controversy because of their negative representation of native Americans. 
The high relief of the pediment, called The Genius of America, and the statues of the niches, highly degraded, are deposited before being replaced by marble replicas, by Bruno Mankowski, George Gianetti and Paul Manship.

Other achievements in America and Italy 
In 1825, the United States Mint commissioned a model of coin, representing the head of Liberty, whose engraving was entrusted to William Kneass. 
Between 1829 and 1850, Persico sculpted several monuments for the cemetery Washington and many busts, including those of:
Charles F. Mercer and Thomas Law, made in 1829;
John Quincy Adams, modeled in March 1829, which included a performance Persico marble in 1835;
Andrew Jackson, made in 1834 and Persico offered by the President January 8, 1835;
Jared Sparks, made in 1834;
William Ellery Channing, made in 1835;
Nicholas Biddle, and John Bannister *Gibson, made in 1837;
Palmerston, made in 1846.

On January 31, 1845, he visited John Quincy Adams, asking him to intervene on behalf of his plans for a  colossal equestrian statue of Washington, which was never executed. 
In 1855, he created a statue of Francis I, of the Two Sicilies to the Foro Borbonico of Palermo and in 1858, the colossal statue of Religion placed at the top of the stairs of the church of Saint Francis of Gaeta. It is also the author of the sculptures from the tomb of Neapolitan surgeon Leonardo Santoro 15 .

While in Marseille, Persico died on May 14, 1860.

References

1791 births
1860 deaths
Artists from Naples
18th-century Italian painters
Italian male painters
19th-century Italian painters
Italian neoclassical painters
Italian sculptors
Italian male sculptors
Italian emigrants to the United States
19th-century sculptors
19th-century Italian male artists
18th-century Italian male artists